Greenleaf Music is an independent music company directed by American trumpeter and composer Dave Douglas. In addition to recordings on CD, vinyl, and digital formats, Greenleaf Music houses sheet music and podcasts, as well as supporting tours by its community of artists.

Founded in 2005 by Douglas and Mike Friedman (of Premonition Records), Greenleaf Music has released albums by Dave Douglas, Donny McCaslin, Nicole Mitchell, Harrison Bankhead, Hamid Drake, Kneebody, Michael Bates, Curtis Robert Macdonald, Linda May Han Oh, Matt Ulery, Ryan Keberle, Rudy Royston, Greg Ward and Mareike Wiening. The Greenleaf Music podcast, A Noise From The Deep, has produced over 70 episodes.

The label operates in New York and is distributed by Redeye Worldwide. Greenleaf Music also has an independent subscription store through the Bandcamp platform.

Discography
 Curtis Robert Macdonald – Community Immunity, 2011
 Dave Douglas & Brass Ecstasy – Spirit Moves, 2009
 Dave Douglas & Keystone – Keystone, 2006; Keystone: Live at Jazz Standard, 2008; Keystone: Live in Sweden, 2007; Spark of Being, 2010
 Dave Douglas and Uri Caine – Present Joys, 2014
 Dave Douglas Quintet – Live at the Bimhuis Set 1 & 2, 2006; Live at the Jazz Standard (Complete Book), 2006; Live at the Jazz Standard, 2007; Meaning and Mystery, 2006
 Dave Douglas – Be Still, 2012; A Single Sky, 2009; GPS, V1: Rare Metals, 2011; GPS, V2: Orange Afternoons, 2011; GPS, V3: Bad Mango, 2011; Magic Triangle/Leap of Faith [2-CD Reissue], 2012; Mountain Passages, 2005; Time Travel, 2013; United Front: Brass Ecstasy at Newport, 2011; High Risk, 2015; Dark Territory, (2016)
 Donny McCaslin – Recommended Tools, 2008; Perpetual Motion, 2011; Casting for Gravity, 2012
 Kneebody – Self-titled, 2005
 Linda May Han Oh – Initial Here, 2012
 Matt Ulery – Wake an Echo, 2013; By a Little Light, 2012
 Michael Bates' Outside Sources – Clockwise, 2008; Live in New York, 2009
 Nicole Mitchell / Harrison Bankhead / Hamid Drake – Indigo Trio: Live in Montreal, 2007
 Nels Cline & Norton Wisdom – Stained Radiance [DVD], 2010

References

External links
 Official site

Jazz record labels
American independent record labels